Sri Veeramakaliamman Temple  (Chinese: 维拉马卡拉曼庙), also known earlier as Soonambu Kambam Kovil, is a Hindu temple located in the middle of Little India in the southern part of Singapore. The temple started as a shrine dedicated to the Hindu goddess Kali and Parvathi in 1855 before a temple was built by Bengali labourers in 1881.

Images of Kali within the temple show her wearing a garland of skulls and ripping out the insides of her victims, and Kali sharing more peaceful family moments with her sons Ganesha and Murugan.

The building is constructed in the style of South Indian Tamil temples common in Tamil Nadu as opposed to the style of Northeastern Indian Kali temples in Bengal, where Her worship is extremely widespread but the style of temple construction differs considerably.

This temple has also been used to shelter people from Japanese air raids during the horrid period of World War 2

In 2018, the Charities Commissioner has barred the temple's chairman Sivakadacham, former chairman R Selvaraju, and secretary Ratha Krishnan Selvakumar from their posts, after the three, who were cheque signatories and approvers for payments, issued more than $1.5 million in uncrossed cheques. Of these, 45 cheques – totalling more than $227,000 – were not issued to the names of the intended recipients of the proceeds. The inquiry also revealed that Ratha had obtained loans of $350,000 without the management committee's approval and with no written loan agreements with the lenders. Cash loans and disbursements of proceeds from the loans were also not properly accounted for in the temple's records.

References

External links
Official site
Uniquely Singapore website

Hindu temples in Singapore
Tourist attractions in Singapore
Tamil Singaporean
Rochor